Voltan is a Maya god.

Voltan may also refer to:
 Luigi Voltan, a shoe company
 Voltan, the villain of Hawk the Slayer
 Voltan, adjective form of Volta

See also
 Votan, another Maya god with a similar name
 Vultan